The 2009 Brabantse Pijl was the 49th edition of the Brabantse Pijl cycle race and was held on 29 March 2009. The race started in Leuven and finished in Beersel. The race was won by Anthony Geslin.

General classification

References

2009
Brabantse Pijl